Paralecta is a genus of moths of the family Xyloryctidae.

Species
 Paralecta acutangula Diakonoff, 1954
 Paralecta amplificata Meyrick, 1925
 Paralecta antistola Meyrick, 1930
 Paralecta cerocrossa Meyrick, 1938
 Paralecta chalarodes Meyrick, 1925
 Paralecta conflata Diakonoff, 1954
 Paralecta electrophanes Meyrick, 1930
 Paralecta hexagona Diakonoff, 1954
 Paralecta iocapna Meyrick, 1925
 Paralecta isopela Meyrick, 1925
 Paralecta nephelodelta Meyrick, 1930
 Paralecta rhodometallica Diakonoff, 1954
 Paralecta tinctoria (Lucas, 1894)
 Paralecta vadosa Meyrick, 1925

References

 
Xyloryctidae
Xyloryctidae genera